Charles Burchill (born 27 November 1959) is a Scottish musician and composer, best known as the guitarist of Simple Minds. He is one of the founders of the group.

Style
During Simple Minds' early to mid-1980s period, Burchill's guitar had a distinctive and atmospheric sound not dissimilar to Echo & the Bunnymen's Will Sergeant. Making heavy use of effects such as delay and chorus, his playing often provided subtle textures behind the band's more drum- and bass-propelled songs. This style was most apparent on 1982's New Gold Dream (81/82/83/84). From 1983's album Sparkle in the Rain onwards the group evolved a different style, bringing Burchill's playing more into the foreground.

As well as providing guitar, Burchill played the violin and saxophone on the band's first three studio albums and took over most studio keyboard duties following the 1989 departure of Mick MacNeil. Burchill with lead singer Jim Kerr are the only original members of the band still performing.

Equipment

Burchill has been playing a Gretsch White Falcon since the early 1980s. He also has a modern one in Black, and a number of 1969 Gibson Les Pauls.  he uses Matchless amplifiers.

References

External links

Charlie Burchill at Discogs
simpleminds.com - Official Website

1959 births
Living people
Musicians from Glasgow
Simple Minds members
Scottish new wave musicians
Scottish rock guitarists
Scottish male guitarists
People educated at Holyrood Secondary School